Assistant commissioner is a rank used in various organizations and may refer to:
Assistant commissioner, an individual who has been given an official charge or authority
Assistant commissioner (police), rank used in police forces
Assistant commissioner (administration), rank used in revenue administrations